Robert Sovík (born July 1, 1991) is a Czech professional ice hockey left winger.

Sovík played eight games with HC Sparta Praha in the Czech Extraliga during the 2010–11 Czech Extraliga season. He also spent three seasons at Hobart College from 2012 to 2015.

References

External links

1991 births
Living people
HC Berounští Medvědi players
Czech ice hockey left wingers
Hobart and William Smith Colleges alumni
HC Kobra Praha players
HC Sparta Praha players
Ice hockey people from Prague